Ray Looze is an American swimming coach. He was born on May 12, 1967, in the Bay area of California. He began his coaching career after finishing 3rd at his last Olympic trials. Already at Texas university, he volunteered there learning the ropes before heading off to the Peddie boarding school in New Jersey. After that, he ended up in Phoenix, Arizona. While at Phoenix he met the love of his life Kandis Perry, who now goes by Kandis Looze (and was born May 10, 1966), at the Olympic training center as they both had kids on their swim clubs make the national team. After quickly marrying Kandis they moved to Stockon, CA where Looze was the head coach at the University of the Pacific (UOP). Since June 2002, he has been the head coach for the Indiana Hoosiers. He runs both the men's and women's swimming programs.

In 2016 Looze was a Women's Assistant Coach for the 2016 USA Olympic Swimming Team. He also served as a coach for the USA team to the 2014 Short Course Worlds.  At the 2016 Olympic Swimming Trials, Looze coached Cody Miller, Blake Pieroni, and Lilly King who all qualified for the team.

Looze is also a former national-team swimmer for the USA. He was a medalist at the 1991 Pan American Games, and swam for USC Trojans in college, from 1986 to 1990.

Awards and recognition 
In 2016, he was named Big 10 Coach of the Year, an honor he has received ten times in other years as well. In 2018, he was named CSCAA National Swimming Coach of the Year.

Family 
Looze is married to Kandis Looze and has one daughter and one son. His daughter, MacKenzie, was born in Stockon, CA on January 13, 2000. Currently, she swims for Coach Looze at Indiana and his son, Bryce, born on July 30, 1998, and currently attends Wabash College in Crawfordsville, IN. Mackenzie was also coached in high school by her mother who is one of the top swimming coaches in the country. 
Looze met Kandis at the Olympic training center (aka the OTC) where they both had swimmers on the national team. It was love at first sight for this pair of coaches and they were quickly married just five and a half months later.

References

Year of birth missing (living people)
Living people
American swimming coaches
American male medley swimmers
Swimmers at the 1991 Pan American Games
Pan American Games bronze medalists for the United States
Pan American Games medalists in swimming
Indiana Hoosiers swimming coaches
USC Trojans men's swimmers
Medalists at the 1991 Pan American Games
20th-century American people